Soddy may refer to:

 Alexander Soddy (born 1982), British conductor and pianist
 Frederick Soddy (1877–1956), English chemist
 Soddy (crater), a lunar crater named for Frederick Soddy
 Sod house or Soddy, a house built using patches of sod
 Soddy-Daisy, Tennessee